Olympiada, known before 1927 as Rakita, is a village and a community of the Eordaia municipality. Before the 2011 local government reform it was part of the municipality of Ptolemaida, of which it was a municipal district. The 2011 census recorded 614 inhabitants in the village.

History
Olympiada was first mentioned in an Ottoman defter of 1481, the village, then known as Rakita, had forty-five households and produced vines, honey, and swine.

References

Populated places in Kozani (regional unit)